The 1979–80 BBC2 Floodlit Trophy was the fifteenth occasion on which the BBC2 Floodlit Trophy competition had been held.
This year, for the  last time, a new name appeared on the  trophy when
Hull F.C. won the trophy by beating Hull Kingston Rovers by the score of 13-3
The match was played at Boulevard, in Hull, East Riding of Yorkshire. The attendance was 18,500, and the  receipts were £16,605
The attendance was a record for a BBC2 Floodlit Trophy, never to be beaten

Background 
This season saw no changes in the  entrants, no new members and no withdrawals, the number remaining at twenty-two.
The format remained as a knock-out competition from the preliminary round through to the  final. 
The preliminary round involved twelve clubs, to reduce the numbers taking part in the  competition proper to just sixteen.

Competition and results

Preliminary round 
Involved  6 matches and 12 clubs

Round 1 – first round 
Involved  8 matches and 16 clubs

Round 2 – quarter finals 
Involved 4 matches with 8 clubs

Round 2 -Quarter-finals – replay 
Involved 1 matches and 2 clubs

Round 3 – semi-finals  
Involved 2 matches and 4 clubs

Final

Teams and scorers 

Scoring - Try = three (3) points - Goal = two (2) points - Drop goal = two (2) points

The road to success 
This tree excludes any preliminary round fixtures

Notes and comments 
1 * the  first BBC2 Floodlit Trophy match to end with a team scoring 1 point
2 * Played in daylight
3 * This match was televised
4 * At the time this was the third highest score
5 * Postponed
6 * The attendance was a record for a BBC2 Floodlit Trophy, never to be beaten
7 * Boulevard was the home ground of Hull F.C. from 1895 until January 2003. The final capacity was 10,500 although the record attendance was 28,798 set on 7 March 1936 in the third round of the Challenge Cup v Leeds

Postscript 
To date, this was the last season for the BBC2 Floodlit Trophy Competition, which had taken place annually only since its inauguration in the 1965-66 season.
Despite several minor disagreements between the BBC and the RFL, including over shirt sponsorship in the early 1970s, overall the competition had been a great success.
However financial cutbacks at the BBC lead to its cancellation after the 1979–80 competition.
Therefore, this season was to be the last. It was greatly missed by many, including those living in a non-Rugby League area

Records from the BBC2 Floodlit Trophy Competition

Entrants and number of cup wins 
This table list all the semi-professional clubs which have entered the competition and the number (and dates) of their cup final wins, cup final runner-up spots, and losing semi-final appearances.

General information for those unfamiliar 
The Rugby League BBC2 Floodlit Trophy was a knock-out competition sponsored by the BBC and between rugby league clubs, entrance to which was conditional upon the club having floodlights. Most matches were played on an evening, and those of which the second half was televised, were played on a Tuesday evening.
Despite the competition being named as 'Floodlit', many matches took place during the afternoons and not under floodlights, and several of the entrants, including  Barrow and Bramley did not have adequate lighting. And, when in 1973, due to the world oil crisis, the government restricted the use of floodlights in sport, all the matches, including the Trophy final, had to be played in the afternoon rather than at night.
The Rugby League season always (until the onset of "Summer Rugby" in 1996) ran from around August-time through to around May-time and this competition always took place early in the season, in the Autumn, with the final taking place in December (The only exception to this was when disruption of the fixture list was caused by inclement weather)

See also 
1979–80 Northern Rugby Football League season
1979 Lancashire Cup
1979 Yorkshire Cup
BBC2 Floodlit Trophy
Rugby league county cups

References

External links
Saints Heritage Society
1896–97 Northern Rugby Football Union season at wigan.rlfans.com 
Hull&Proud Fixtures & Results 1896/1897
Widnes Vikings - One team, one passion Season In Review - 1896-97
The Northern Union at warringtonwolves.org
Huddersfield R L Heritage

BBC2 Floodlit Trophy
BBC2 Floodlit Trophy